Euscelis is a leafhopper genus in the subfamily Deltocephalinae.

Species
Euscelis alsioides Remane, 1967
Euscelis alsius Ribaut, 1952
Euscelis ancoripenis Remane, 1967
Euscelis caucasica Emeljanov, 1962
Euscelis caudata Osborn, 1926
Euscelis chamaespartii Remane, 2002
Euscelis corhelita Remane, 2002
Euscelis curticeps Lindberg, 1927
Euscelis distinguenda (Kirschbaum, 1858)
Euscelis genisticola Remane, 1967
Euscelis gredincola Remane, 2002
Euscelis hamulus (Kuoh, 1981)
Euscelis heptneri Zachvatkin, 1945
Euscelis hiertalba Remane, 2002
Euscelis himargeni Remane, 2002
Euscelis incisa (Kirschbaum, 1858)
Euscelis lineolata Brullé, 1832
Euscelis marocisus Remane, 1988
Euscelis nemesia (Cogan, 1916)
Euscelis ohausi Wagner, 1939
Euscelis ononidis Remane, 1967
Euscelis ormaderensis Remane, 1968
Euscelis quinquemaculata Osborn, 1923
Euscelis remanei Strübing, 1980
Euscelis seriphidii Emeljanov, 1962
Euscelis siquadristriata Remane, 1967
Euscelis taigacolus Dlabola, 1971
Euscelis tuvensis Vilbaste, 1980
Euscelis ulicis Ribaut, 1952
Euscelis venitala Remane, Bückle & Guglielmino, 2005
Euscelis venosa (Kirschbaum, 1868)

References 

Cicadellidae genera
Athysanini
Taxa named by Gaspard Auguste Brullé